Benjamin Franklyn Whaley (October 14, 1926 – November 4, 2001) was an American college football and basketball coach and National Football League player.

References

External links
 
 

1926 births
2001 deaths
American football guards
American football tackles
Hampton Pirates baseball coaches
Hampton Pirates football coaches
Hampton Pirates men's basketball coaches
Los Angeles Dons players
North Carolina Central Eagles baseball coaches
North Carolina Central Eagles football coaches
Virginia State Trojans football players
Sportspeople from Richmond, Virginia
Coaches of American football from Virginia
Players of American football from Richmond, Virginia
Basketball coaches from Virginia